Fallen Firefighters Memorial is a bronze sculpture group by Hai Ying Wu.

It is located in Occidental Park, Seattle, near the intersection of Occidental Avenue and Main Street.
It was inspired by the deaths of four Seattle firefighters who died January 5, 1995 fighting a fire in the Mary Pang warehouse in Seattle's International District.

See also
 List of firefighting monuments and memorials

References

1998 sculptures
Bronze sculptures in Washington (state)
Firefighting in the United States
Firefighting memorials
Monuments and memorials in Seattle
Outdoor sculptures in Seattle
Sculptures of men in Washington (state)
Statues in Seattle
Pioneer Square, Seattle
1998 establishments in Washington (state)
Seattle Fire Department